Medoids are representative objects of a data set or a cluster within a data set whose sum of dissimilarities to all the objects in the cluster is minimal. Medoids are similar in concept to means or centroids, but medoids are always restricted to be members of the data set. Medoids are most commonly used on data when a mean or centroid cannot be defined, such as graphs. They are also used in contexts where the centroid is not representative of the dataset like in images, 3-D trajectories and  gene expression (where while the data is sparse the medoid need not be).  These are also of interest while wanting to find a representative using some distance other than squared euclidean distance (for instance in movie-ratings).

For some data sets there may be more than one medoid, as with medians.
A common application of the medoid is the k-medoids clustering algorithm, which is similar to the k-means algorithm but works when a mean or centroid is not definable. This algorithm basically works as follows. First, a set of medoids is chosen at random. Second, the distances to the other points are computed. Third, data are clustered according to the medoid they are most similar to. Fourth, the medoid set is optimized via an iterative process.

Note that a medoid is not equivalent to a median, a geometric median, or centroid. A median is only defined on 1-dimensional data, and it only minimizes dissimilarity to other points for metrics induced by a norm (such as the Manhattan distance or Euclidean distance). A geometric median is defined in any dimension, but is not necessarily a point from within the original dataset.

Definition 
Let  be a set of  points in a  space with a distance function d. Medoid is defined as

Clustering with Medoids 

Medoids are a popular replacement for the cluster mean when the distance function is not (squared) Euclidean distance, or not even a metric (as the medoid does not require the triangle inequality). When partitioning the data set into clusters, the medoid of each cluster can be used as a representative of each cluster.

Clustering algorithms based on the idea of medoids include:
 Partitioning Around Medoids (PAM), the standard k-medoids algorithm
 Hierarchical Clustering Around Medoids (HACAM), which uses medoids in hierarchical clustering

Algorithms to compute the medoid of a set 
From the definition above, it is clear that the medoid of a set  can be computed after computing all pairwise distances between points in the ensemble. This would take   distance evaluations (with ). In the worst case, one can not compute the medoid with fewer distance evaluations.<ref name=":1">Newling, James; & Fleuret, François (2016); "A sub-quadratic exact medoid algorithm", in Proceedings of the 20th International Conference on Artificial Intelligence and Statistics, PMLR 54:185-193, 2017 Available online.</ref> However, there are many approaches that allow us to compute medoids either exactly or approximately in sub-quadratic time under different statistical models.

However, in higher dimensional real spaces, no linear-time algorithm is known. RAND is an algorithm that estimates the average distance of each point to all the other points by sampling a random subset of other points. It takes a total of  
where   is the maximum
distance between two points
in the ensemble. Note that RAND is an approximation algorithm, and moreover
 may not be known apriori.

RAND was leveraged by 
TOPRANK  which 
uses the estimates obtained by RAND to focus on a small subset of candidate points, evaluates the average distance of these points exactly, and picks the minimum of those. TOPRANK needs  
 distance computations 
to find the exact'' medoid with high probability 
under a distributional assumption 
on the average distances.

trimed  
presents an algorithm 
to find the medoid with 

distance evaluations under a distributional 
assumption on the points. The algorithm uses the triangle inequality to cut down the search space.

Meddit leverages 
a connection of the medoid computation with multi-armed bandits and uses an upper-Confidence-bound type of algorithm to get 
an algorithm which takes  distance evaluations under statistical
assumptions on the points.

Correlated Sequential Halving also leverages multi-armed bandit techniques, improving upon Meddit. By exploiting the correlation structure in the problem, the algorithm is able to provably yield drastic improvement (usually around 1-2 orders of magnitude) in both number of distance computations needed and wall clock time.

Implementations 
An implementation of RAND, TOPRANK, and trimed can be found here. An implementation of Meddit
can be found here and here. An implementation of Correlated Sequential Halving
can be found here.

References 

Cluster analysis
Means